Geoffrey Horrocks (1932/33 Leicester – 12 September 2012) was a British mathematician working on vector bundles, who introduced the Horrocks construction used in the ADHM construction, and the Horrocks–Mumford bundle and monads.

He was a professor at Newcastle University until his retirement in 1998.

Publications

References
LMS newsletter obituary

2012 deaths
1930s births
Academics of Newcastle University
Alumni of Queens' College, Cambridge
20th-century British mathematicians
21st-century British mathematicians
Algebraic geometers